Karl O'Sullivan is an Irish professional footballer who plays for League of Ireland club Sligo Rovers. He plays as a right midfielder and occasionally as a right-back.

Club career
O'Sullivan started his career with Limerick, starting with the under-19's then progressing up to the first team. He made his debut against Shamrock Rovers in a 2–1 defeat. He scored his first goal in a 6–3 away win against Waterford, scoring in the 22nd minute to make it 3–0. In January 2020 O'Sullivan transferred to Finn Harps, following Limerick's demise. He scored in his second game for the club, the winner against Sligo Rovers.

In December 2021 Sligo Rovers announced that they had signed O'Sullivan on a two-year contract.

International career
In February 2019, O'Sullivan was called up to the Irish U21 side for a friendly again the Irish national amateur team. He came on as a substitute in the 92nd minute in the 1–0 win. He was then called up again later that year for a match against China U23, this time starting the match as his side won 4–1.

Career statistics

References

1999 births
Living people
Republic of Ireland association footballers
Association football wingers
League of Ireland players
Finn Harps F.C. players